The Georgian Stock Exchange (literally "Georgian Stock Exchange Market") is the principal stock exchange in the country of Georgia.  It was created by the "Joint Stock Company Georgian Stock Exchange Charter" which was registered and approved in 1999.  It is located in the capital city of Tbilisi and its abbreviation in English is GeSE. The Georgian Stock Exchange is a member of the Federation of Euro-Asian Stock Exchanges.

See also
Economy of Georgia
List of stock exchanges
List of European stock exchanges
Caufex Electronic Commodities and Derivatives Exchange

External links
Georgian Stock Exchange official website, in English and Georgian

1999 establishments in Georgia (country)
Economy of Georgia (country)
Stock exchanges in Europe
Stock exchanges in Asia